Sébastien Thurière (born January 6, 1990) is a Haitian footballer who last played as a midfielder for Penang in Malaysia Premier League.

Early life
Thurière was born in St. Petersburg, Florida. Prior to his professional career he played soccer at the University of South Florida. He recorded 13 goals and 7 assists in his college career. He captained the South Florida Bulls for 3 years before graduating with a BA in Environmental Science and starting his professional career.

Youth
In 2004, Thurière spent playing at Cap Girondins de Bordeaux youth academy in Bordeaux France, finishing first in his class.

He was tagged by Real Salt Lake's MLS program between 2007–2008. In 2008 , he trained with Blackburn Rovers FC Reserves in England for 3 weeks.

He was rated Seminole High School's best midfielder for three consecutive years between 06–08. He was named MVP in ‘07 and ‘08, along with Pinellas All-County Player of the Year (2008), County All-Star team honors (2008) and led Seminole HS in scoring (2008). Three time State Champions and one regional title with RSL Club in Tampa, Fl. He was named to RISE Magazine’s All Soccer Area Team in ‘07 and ‘08.

Professional career

VSI Tampa Bay
Thurière made his debut for VSI Tampa Bay FC of USL Pro on 30 March 2013 in a 1-0 loss to Phoenix FC in which he started.

Dayton Dutch Lions
After VSI Tampa Bay was shut down in late 2013, Thurière remained in the USL with Dayton Dutch Lions for the 2014 season. Thuriere was released by Dayton after the club chose to leave USL and return to amateur status following the season.

Charleston Battery
Thurière joined his third USL club Charleston Battery for the 2015 season and made 19 appearances. Played a strong roll as a central midfielder, but missed a good portion of the season due to International play with Haiti. Thuriere was called up for World Cup Qualifiers, International friendlies, and the 2015 Gold Cup.

San Antonio FC
After a pre season camp with SK Brann, Thurière signed with USL expansion club San Antonio FC in early 2016.

International
Though born and raised in the United States, Thurière is eligible for the Haiti national team and was first called into the squad for the 2014 Caribbean Cup. Thurière has become a regular member of the national side, recording one assist in a qualification game (Haiti 1-0 Trinidad) helped Haiti qualify for the first time in the Nation's history for the Copa America Centario. He has been selected for 30 matches, and has earned himself 20 caps with the Senior team in which many he has started. He has participated in World Cup Qualifiers for 2018 Russia, Caribbean Cup 2014 (3rd place), CONCACAF 2015 Gold Cup, Copa America Centario 2016 qualification, Copa America Camp, and Caribbean Cup 2016.

Career statistics

Club
Statistics accurate as of 16 January 2014

References

External links 
 VSI Tampa Bay Profile

1990 births
Living people
American soccer players
American sportspeople of Haitian descent
Citizens of Haiti through descent
Haitian footballers
Haiti international footballers
South Florida Bulls men's soccer players
IMG Academy Bradenton players
VSI Tampa Bay FC (PDL) players
VSI Tampa Bay FC players
Dayton Dutch Lions players
Charleston Battery players
San Antonio FC players
Association football midfielders
Soccer players from St. Petersburg, Florida
USL League Two players
USL Championship players
2014 Caribbean Cup players
2015 CONCACAF Gold Cup players